Mustafa Rahi, (1931–1986) was a poet of classical and neo classical Urdu Ghazal from Pakistan. He remained out of the lime light all his life. A selection of his works was published in 1993 by Murtaza Birlas

Mustafa Rahi edited and compiled several books related to his mentor - Jigar Moradabadi.

His style comprises strong emotional expressions, with a whole hearted commitment to the elegance of ghazal. His style of poetry has earned recognition from his peers.

Works

His published works are:
 Ehed Aafreen: Ghazal 
 Jigar Namay: Letters of Jigar 
 Bayad-e-Jigar: A compilation of remarks about Jigar 
 Baqol-e-Jigar: Quotations from Jigar
 Jigar Hamaree Nazr Main: Critical reviews about Jigar 
 Namay Jo Mere Naam Aye: Compilation of letters to Nazir Siddiqui

External links

1931 births
1986 deaths
Pakistani poets
Urdu-language poets from Pakistan
20th-century poets